Borskoye is the name of several rural localities in Russia:
Borskoye, Kaliningrad Oblast, a settlement in Slavinsky Rural Okrug of Gvardeysky District of Kaliningrad Oblast
Borskoye, Samara Oblast, a selo in Borsky District of Samara Oblast

See also
Borsky (disambiguation)